This is a list of the longest animated feature films by running time.

Individual films 
Films with a running time of 120 minutes (2 hours) or more are included here. Note: Some releases are extended cuts or director's cuts and are ranked according to the longest verified running time.

Films released in separate parts 
This section lists films conceived as an artistic unity and produced simultaneously, or consecutively with no significant interruption or change of production team, despite being released with separate premieres.

See also 

 List of longest films
 Lists of animated feature films

References 

longest
Longest animated
Longest animated films
F